Vilakuvelil Cherian Samuel (Malayalam: വി.സി. ശമുവേൽ ; Syriac: ܫܡܽܘܐܝܶܠ ܆ ܫܡܘܐܝܠ ; Hebrew: שְׁמוּאֵל ; Greek: Σαμουήλ ; Arabic: صموئيل; Latin: Samūēl ; Amharic: ሳሙኤል ) (1912–1998), called Samuel Achen was an Indian Christian philosopher, scholar, university professor, theologian, historian, polyglot and ecumenical leader. He was a priest of the Indian Orthodox Church. He was the author of many doctrinal books and papers including The Council of Chalcedon Re-Examined: Historical Theological Survey.

Early life
Samuel was born 6 April 1912, at Edayil House - Cheekanal in the village of Omallur, in the British Raj Province of Travancore, now Pathanamthitta, Kerala, India. He was born in an Orthodox Syrian Christian family. He was the fifth child of nine children of his parents Edayil I. Cherian and Annamma. His father Edayil Cherian was a school teacher and educator, who established 15 primary schools when there were few facilities for modern education and a member of the Legislative Assembly (Sree Moolam Popular Assembly).

Education
Samuel had his primary education in a school founded by his father in his village and the Government English Middle School, Pathanamthitta. Samuel obtained his secondary education at St. Thomas English High School (St. Thomas Higher Secondary School Kozhencherry). He received his English School Leaving Certificate (E.S.L.C) in 1931 with distinction.

Seminary teacher and scholar

In addition to his general education, Samuel learned the Syriac language, which was the ecclesiastical and liturgical language of the St. Thomas Christians of Kerala.

Patriarch Mar Ignatius Elias III of Antioch visited India in 1932. Samuel had a sincere longing for the success of the patriarchal mission and was deeply moved when the spiritual head of the Syrian Orthodox Church died at Manjanikkara, in the neighborhood of his home in 1932. The place where the Patriarch had died soon grew in stature as St. Ignatius Church, a center of religious activities, including the teaching of Syriac and Antiochene Syrian ecclesiastical doctrine. Samuel pursued further Syriac studies at Manjanikkara Dayara (monastery). He had been attracted there by the presence of the Syrian Metropolitan Elias Mar Julius, the delegate of the Patriarch, and the Syrian Deacon and Rabban 'Abdel Ahad (monk), (who later become Patriarch Mor Ignatius Ya`qub III). At the time, he had no plans to be ordained. He merely wanted to continue his theological research.

Samuel did so well academically that in few years he completed his studies. He began to share teaching duties with a colleague, Malpan Dn. Abdul Ahad Remban. Samuel also served as the secretary and translator for the Metropolitan who knew only Arabic and Syriac.

In addition to Malayalam, his mother tongue, Samuel mastered Sanskrit, Tamil and Hindi the Indian languages and English and continued his private study of both languages. He maintained his command of English by reading books on church history, theology, and biblical and devotional subjects. Besides the above languages and ecclesiastical subjects, he mastered Syriac, one of the ancient and classical languages and planned for advanced study and research in university level. 

In 1944, Samuel joined the Union Christian College as a priest thirteen years after he had completed his high school studies to follow a regular university program of academic discipline and devoted in study and research for another sixteen years.

1944–1948 Union Christian College Alwaye, India: B.A. Degree in philosophy, first rank with gold medal, University of Travancore later University of Kerala )
1948–1950 Madras Christian College, India: M.A., Philosophy, First Class, Madras University
1950–1953 United Theological College, Bangalore, India: B.D., Theology, Distinction, with Special awards Serampore College, West Bengal, India
1953–1954 Union Seminary, New York: S.T.M, Post Graduates Degree in Theology magna cum laude
1954–1957 Yale Divinity School, New Haven, US: PhD, Yale University magna cum laude
1957–1960 Christian Institute for the Study of Religion and Society (C.I.S.R.S), Bangalore; Ramakrishna Mission Centers; India; University of Chicago, Chicago, US: Post Doctoral Research Scholar, Rockefeller Foundation Fellow

Samuel spent long periods for further research in various academic centres: Serampore College, West Bengal; United Theological College, Bangalore; CNI Library, Kottayam and Syriac Library of Pampakkuda all in India; Addis Ababa Library - Ethiopia; Bodleian Library, Oxford; British Museum Library / British Museum Reading Room, London; Library of the Bossey Ecumenical Institute, Switzerland; Library of the Jesuit College, Louvain; and the Vatican Library, Rome.

Doctoral research: Christological controversy
With a background in secular education, Samuel researched anew the History of Christian thought, which he chose for his specialization; the classical doctrine of the Person of Christ worked out in the fifth century, which led to the first division in the Church that continues today.  Samuel's mastery of philosophy, and both Syriac and Greek, made it possible for him to work with ancient texts and documents to carry on his Alexandrine-Antiochene Christologies.

In choosing this area, Samuel's purpose was ecumenism. The fifth century division in the Church has been interpreted by Church traditions, each in its own way to make out that its acceptance or rejection of the councils in question was the result of a concern to conserve the Christian truth exclusively and the others were really at fault. Samuel's sense of objectivity and impartiality led him to feel that this reading must be as much one-sided as it was superficial, and that he should himself study the issues involved in the controversy. Thus his purpose was, in the first place, to find out him why the division arose, insofar as that was possible. Secondly, perhaps more importantly, to clarify all concerned why the Churches exist in a divide state. In other words, his work was intended to be of service to the Churches and the cause of Christian unity. From this point of view, Samuel had a special concern for the Churches of the East, particularly those of the Oriental Orthodox family, which have continued in the history without formally acknowledging the Council of Chalcedon on 451 A.D. These Church traditions have been referred to as "monophysite" heretical community by the Byzantine or the Eastern Orthodox Churches, the Catholic Church and the major Protestant Churches. In the face of this label of "heresy", Samuel felt interested in bringing out the real point of the division following the Council of 451 and the teaching of the fathers who opposed it. Samuel attempted to rescue Oriental Orthodoxy from centuries of intellectual oblivion. The doctoral thesis, "The Council of Chalcedon Re-examined: A Historical and Theological Survey" were published worldwide along with several papers. This stand represented the Oriental Orthodox perspective.

Post-doctoral research scholar
Samuel was a pioneer in these studies. He promoted the concept that the Church in India should be Indian. Out of this concern, he had deep interest in comparing at the roots of the historic faith with the religious heritage of Hinduism. Secondly, he realized that the claim of Apostolic origin and the identity as Syrian Christians of India, does not tally with its present standing either as part of the Catholic Church or that of Antiochene Syrian Church. From this point of view however, both these sections of the Indian Christianity could envision a common future. Over the years, he promoted the history of the Indian Church and its foreign connections. He took the opportunity to compare them with other ancient Churches, particularly those of the East.

Samuel's concentration on the nuances of the classical doctrine of the person of Jesus Christ during his postgraduate studies did not leave him free to continue his studies in Hinduism. However, on completing his doctorate at Yale, an opportunity arose. Dr. P.D. Devanandan was establishing the Christian Institute for the Study of Religion and Society in Bangalore. Feeling that an association with the institute might enable him to combine the two plans, he joined it in 1957 under an appointment for the post-doctoral research programme sponsored by the University of Chicago. He was awarded the Rockefeller Fellowship for a period of three years. This included research for two years in India and one year in Chicago. Besides Indian Philosophy, Sankaracharya's Advaita, Ramanujacharya's Visishtadvaita and Madvacharya's Dvaita Vedanta, that opportunity helped him to acquire first-hand knowledge of the Philosophy of Swami Vivekananda and working of the Ramakrishna Mission as well as of several others in contemporary Indian movements like Mahatma Gandhi's gramaswaraj and Vinoba Bhave's Bhoodan movement.

Polyglot
Samuel was familiar with fifteen languages including his mother tongue, Malayalam and a scholar in Sanskrit, Syriac, Hebrew, Greek, Ge'ez and Arabic which he could teach in seminaries and universities.

Career

Teaching

1933–1944	Manjanikkara Dayara - Seminary (Malphano), Pathanamthitta, Kerala, India.
1960 - 1963	Serampore College, Serampore, West Bengal, India.
1963–1966	Theological College of the Holy Trinity, Haile Selassie I University (Addis Ababa University), Ethiopia.
1966–1968	United Theological College, Bangalore, Karnataka, India.
1968–1976	Theological College of the Holy Trinity, Haile Selassie I University, Addis Ababa
1977–1978	Ecumenical Christian Centre, Whitefield, Bangalore.
1978–1980	United Theological College, Bangalore.
1981–1991	Orthodox Theological Seminary, Kottayam (Orthodox Pazhaya Seminary), Kottayam, Kerala.
1982 - 1991	Federated Faculty for Research in Religion and Culture, Kerala.

In addition to the above, Samuel served as a professor, guide, and examiner in almost all the seminaries and theological colleges in India, and many abroad.

Ecumenical movement
Samuel's presence and contribution in the ecumenical movement in the international arena for three decades. He was an accredited delegate of the Indian Orthodox Church at four of the General Assemblies of the World Council of Churches:

1954 - Evanston, United States.
1961 -	New Delhi, India
1968 -	Uppsala, Sweden, and
1976 – Nairobi, Kenya.

Faith and Order Commission
The New Delhi World Assembly of World Council of Churches in 1961 voted Samuel as a member of the council's Faith and Order Commission. He held that position until 1984. The fourth general assembly of the WCC, at Uppsala in 1968, elected him as a member of the commission's Working Committee and later in its steering committee. His active participation in the meetings of Faith and Order Commission was influential and expressed the importance of church unity. In his paper in the Faith and Order meeting at Accra 1974 on the subject "How can the Unity of the Church be Achieved" he points to the influence of "different intellectual and cultural backgrounds" in the evolution the different church traditions, awareness of which should help relativize these traditions. He was a participant of seven meetings of the commission.
 1963 – Montreal, Canada
 1964 – Arhus, Denmark
 1967 – Bristol, UK
 1971 – Louvain, Belgium
 1974 - Accra, Ghana
 1978 – Bangalore, India and
 1982 – Lima, Peru

Joint commissions
Samuel took a part in a number of study projects and joint commissions of the Catholic, Eastern Orthodox, Oriental Orthodox, and Protestant Churches. The papers presented took an interest in discussing the issues from an Oriental Orthodox perspective. The papers were published under the auspices of the World Council of Churches:

Apostolicity and Catholicity
The Early Councils
The Council of Chalcedon
Authority of the Bible
Uniatism and its Problem
Baptism, Eucharist and Ministry Text; or Lima Document

Dialogue between Eastern and Oriental Orthodox theologians

The period of Samuel's association with the Faith and Order Commission of World Council of Churches coincided with two progresses where he made a valuable and lasting contribution. Those were "Unofficial Consultation of Theologians of the Eastern and Oriental Orthodox Churches" held in Arhus-1964, Bristol-1967, Geneva-1970 and Addis Ababa-1971. Samuel presented papers at all of them and helped the participants in arriving at the conclusion that the difference in Christological Doctrine between the two families of Churches was only verbal and not substantial. These papers and joint agreed statements have been published in different journals.

Dialogue between Catholic and Oriental Orthodox theologians
The second was a series of four consultations organised by the Pro Oriente Foundation of Vienna, Austria in 1972. These were called "Unofficial Consultations of Theologians of the Catholic and Oriental Orthodox Churches". Samuel participated in them as an Orthodox theologian, presenting papers that were published under the auspices of the Pro Oriente Foundation. The first three of the consultations discussed the doctrine of the Person of Jesus Christ, on which there was agreement among participants that the difference between two Church traditions was not substantial. 

Starting in 1964, Samuel took part in almost all the various meetings of the Unofficial Consultation of Theologians of Oriental Orthodox, Eastern Orthodox and Roman Catholic Churches presenting papers, participated in the discussions, and drafting out for the agreed statements. He has served as a member of a group called together by the Faith and Order Commission of the World Council of Churches for a study, first of the Councils of early Church, and later of the Council of Chalcedon. The papers presented were published in the Greek Orthodox Theological Review, Brookline, Massachusetts, United States, Wort und Worhiet, Pro Oriente, Vienna, Ecumenical Review, World Council of Churches, Geneva and Abba Salama, Addis Ababa. Thus, Samuel's lifelong search for truth and the meticulous outcome helped to pave the way for a closer understanding, better relationship between the Chalcedonian and Non Chalcedonian Christendom, after a period of fifteen centuries of split and schism.

Ethiopian life

The Church of Ethiopia and Haile Selassie I University (since renamed Addis Ababa University) persuaded Samuel to return to Ethiopia. The college appointed him Dean of the Theological College of the Holy Trinity in 1969, a position that he held until he left Ethiopia in July 1976. He also served as the Secretary of the Faculty Council of the university.

The Great Conference of Oriental Orthodox Churches

Samuel helped organize the Conference of the Oriental Orthodox Churches with the initiative of both the Emperor Haile Selassie I and the acting Patriarch of Ethiopia, Abune Theophilus (later Patriarch). The conference brought together the five Oriental Orthodox Churches, Coptic, Syriac, Armenian, Ethiopian and Indian, which were isolated after the fifth century.

He was a member of the local committee and General Coordinator, responsible for the preparatory work of the Addis Ababa Conference of the Heads of Oriental Orthodox Churches, which held in January 1965. He was also one of the delegates along with the likes of Fr. T. C. Jacob in the Conference with the Catholicos Baselios Augen I and others representing Indian Orthodox Church. He edited the report of the Conference and published it by the interim committee.

Association of Ethio-Hellenic Studies
Samuel entered into a programme initiated by Methodios Fouyas, the Metropolitan of the Greek Orthodox Church of Aksum, founding the Association of Ethio-Hellenic Studies. Samuel was the vice-president of it, and editorial board of the publications 'Abba Salama' and the 'Ecliastca Fharan', in English, Greek, Amharic and Ge'ez languages. V.C. Samuel, throughout his life, expressed his desire to see the unity of the Indian churches that belong to the Syrian tradition.  Unity with the 'Jacobite Faction' of the Indian Orthodox Church was given priority. An ecumenical unity with the churches belonging to the Protestant tradition was also envisaged.  As an Indian Christian V.C Samuel advocated the need of fostering wider ecumenism with other faiths in general and Hinduism in particular.

Ministry in the Indian (Malankara) Orthodox Church
Ordained at the age of twenty-five Samuel continued his ministry in the Indian Orthodox Church for a period of six decades:

1931–1932 	Inspector, Sunday School
1932–1940	Secretary and Translator of Elias Mar Julius, Delegate Bishop of the Patriarch
194-1940 Malpan St. Ignatius Dayara, (Seminary), Manjinikkara, Omalloor
1935	Ordained as a Deacon.
1937	Ordained as a Priest
1937 - 1940 	Priest and Malpan, Manjinikkara Dayara and Seminary
1940–1944	Vicar and Malpan, St. Thomas Syrian Orthodox Church Chengalam, Kottayam, Kerala
1944–1948	Alwaye, Kerala, India
1944–1998	Member, Governing Board of the Christu Shishya Ashram, Thadakom, Coimbatore, Tamil Nadu, India
1948–1950	Service in Thambaram and Madras City
1950–1953	First full-time Vicar, of the Orthodox Christian Church in Bangalore, Holy Trinity Church, Bangalore.
1950-1953 Started a new congregation in Jalahalli area and conducted Holy Qurbana intermittent
1957–1959	 During Post Doctoral Research program,  Spiritual service in Holy Trinity Church, Bangalore and Jalahally intermittent. Later in 1966 Jalahalli Congregation developed in to full-fledged parish dedicated in the name of St. Mary. in 1966. Founder Father of St. Mary's Orthodox Valiyapally, Jalahally East, Bangalore
1960–1963	Spiritual Service in Serampore College Chapel, Barrakpore, across the River Hoogly, Calcutta
Foundation Stone laid for the Calcutta Parish
1963–1966	Indian Orthodox Congregation, in Addis Ababa, Ethiopia
1966–1968	 During the teaching in United Theological College Intermittent Service in Holy Trinity Church, Bangalore and St. Mary's Orthodox Valiyapally, Jalahalli
1966 Appointed as the founder president of the new Church building Committee for Bangalore Orthodox Congregation
1972 New Church was dedicated in the name of St. Gregorios of Parumala (St. Gregorios Orthodox Cathedral, Bangalore) 1972
1968 Appointed as the Ambassador of the Indian Orthodox Church in Ethiopia and African Countries, by Baselios Augen I, Catholicose of the East
1968–1976	Vicar, Addis Ababa
1970	Inauguration of the parsonage of the St. Gregorios Orthodox Cathedral, Bangalore
1976–1982	Formation of new Congregation in Bangalore East. Conducted Holy Qurbana in Sevanilayam Chapel for six years
1982	Bangalore East congregation built a new church building and dedicated in the name of St. Thomas. Founder Father of the St. Thomas Orthodox Church, Bangalore East
1982–1998	Formation of St. Stephen's Orthodox Chapel, Rajajinagar, Bangalore. later St. Stephens Orthodox Church, Vijayanagar, Bangalore. Founder Father

Association
Founder Chief Advisor, Church Weekly, Alwaye, India
Chief Advisor and Lifelong Governing Board member; Christu Sishya Ashram, Tadagom, Coimbatore, India
Hindu Christian Dialogue, CISRS, Bangalore
Editor, Indian Journal of Theology, Calcutta
Secretary and Editor, Theological Forum, Bangalore
Founder Vice-president and Editor, Association of Ethio-Hellenic Studies, Addis Ababa, Ethiopia
Editor Abba Salama, Review of Ethio Hellenic Studies, Journal, Addis Ababa
Editor Ecclisiastica Faran. Addis Ababa
Patron, Indian Community School, Addis Ababa
President, St. Gregorios Orthodox Cathedral, Bangalore (Church Building Committee 1967
WCC Delegate, Christian Muslim Dialogue
Advisor, All Africa Christian Conference
Advisor, Emperor Haile Selassie I
Advisor,  Abuna Theophilos, Patriarch of the Ethiopian Orthodox Church
Member and Chief Advisor, Church History Association of India, Bangalore
Editorial board member, History of Christianity in India, Bangalore
Editorial Executive Member, Bible Commentary, CSS, Thiruvalla
Editorial Executive Encyclopedia of Indian Orthodox Church
Editorial Board Ethiopian Orthodox Church Publications
Governing board member, Orthodox Theological Seminary, Kottayam
Resource Person, Thiruvachanabhashyam, Kottayam
Resource Person Divyabodhanam, Kottayam
Editorial board member, Malankara Sabha, Kottayam
Editorial board member, Purohithan
Member Joint International Commission: Catholic Church and Malankara Orthodox Church
Chief Editor, Harp, Kottayam
Chief Advisor, St. Ephrem Ecumenical Research Institute, Kottayam
President, Fifty Golden Years Celebrations Committee, Bangalore

Ambassador of the Indian Church
The church planned to consecrate him as a bishop in the early 1950s. He declined the offer and instead chose to continue to pursue ecumenism through academia.

In 1968, the Catholicose Baselius Ougen I, the Head of the Malankara Orthodox Church appointed Samuel as the Christian Embassador to Ethiopia and other African Countries.

Doctor of the Church
In 1991, Professor Samuel Chandanappally published Malankara Sabha Pithakkanmar Fathers of the Malankara Church. The book listed Samuel as the greatest Doctor of the Indian Church.

Death
Samuel died in the early morning of Wednesday 18, November 1998 at his residence in Bangalore. Funeral service was conducted on 20th Friday at St. Gregorios Cathedral where he had served. Bishops Philipose Mar Eusebius and Mathews Mar Severus, his former students, led the service assisted by hundreds of Priests. Baselios Mar Thoma Mathews II, who was unable to attend due to hospitalization, flew directly to Bangalore after his discharge from the hospital on 22nd morning and conducted Thanksgiving Holy Qurbana at the cathedral, and delivered a memorial.

Bibliography
Samuel published in India and abroad. A list of most titles, with publisher and date of publication, is given below. His writings are listed under three headings.

	Articles, papers, book reviews etc., in popular newspapers like Malayala Manorama, Deepika, Weeklies, Church Papers and Religious journals. Some of them deal with the issues in a learned way and some in a more popular manner.
	Lengthy papers dealing with theology, Christology, Church history, ecclesiology, canon, ecumenism, Hinduism, Philosophy of Vivekananda, and Ramakrishna Mission and other contemporary subjects, were published, by WCC, Geneva, Greek Orthodox Theological Review, Athens, Wort and Worhiet, Vienna, Abba Salama, Addis Ababa, Indian Journal of Theology, Religion and Society, Star of the East, etc.
	Books:  From 1959 to 1995, Samuel published twenty-five books. He has also written the History of Christianity, in Kerala section in volume IV of the History of Christianity in India for the Church History Association of India. His autobiographical piece 'Ente Chinthavikasanam' (Evolution of My Thinking) 1957 and the 'Swanubhavavediyil, (My Life Experience) which was published at the age of 85.

Books in English
	Marriage and Celibacy; Addis Ababa, 1972
	Ramakrishna Movement: The World Mission of Hinduism; Christian Institute for the Study of Religion and Society (CISRS), Bangalore, India, 1959
	The Oriental Orthodox Churches Addis Ababa Conference January 1965; Ed. For the Interim Committee, m Addis Ababa, Ethiopia, 1965., 
	Christianity and Indigenization; Addis Ababa, 1976
	The Council of Chalcedon Re-Examined: A Historical Theological Survey; Indian Theological library, No.8, Christian Literature Society (C.L.S), Madras, India, 1977. British Orthodox Press, London, UK, 2003.
	An Orthodox Catechism on The Faith and Life of the Church;  Mar Gregorios Orthodox Christian Student
	Movement (MGOCSM), Kottayam, India, 1983.
	Truth Triumphs: Life and Achievements of Metropolitan Mar Dionysius VI;  Malanakara Orthodox Church (M.O.C), Kottayam, India, 1986
	The Growing Church:  An Introduction to Indian Church History; Divya Bodhanam Publication, Orthodox Theological Seminary (O.T.S), Kottayam, India, 1992.
	Fifty Golden Years; Orthodox Congregations, Bangalore, India, 1994.
	Orthodox Catechism: Text Book – Class VIII, Oriental Orthodox Churches.
	Orthodox Catechism: Text Book – Class IX, Oriental Orthodox Churches.
	Orthodox Catechism: Text Book – Class X, Oriental Orthodox Churches.
	Orthodox Catechism: Text Book – Class XI, Oriental Orthodox Churches.
	Orthodox Catechism: Text Book – Class XII, Oriental Orthodox Churches.
	An Introduction to Christian Theology

Co-author

	Syrian Orthodox Eucharistic Worship: Ways and Worship; Ed.H.R.Machphail, Madras, 1950.
	An Ancient Church: A Glance into the Past and Peep into the Future; New Life in an Old Church, Ed. M.V.George, Calcutta, 1963.
	Faith of Christianity; Christianity, published by Punjab University, 1969.
	The Faith of the Church; The Church of Ethiopia:A Panorama of History and Spiritual Life, Addis Ababa, Ethiopia 1972
	God Whom We Worship: The Teachings of Gregory Nazianzen; Prayer and Contemplation, Asirvanam Benedictine Monastery, Bangalore, 1980
	Grace in the Cappadocian Fathers; Divine Grace and Human Response, Asirvanam Monastery, 1981.
	The Indian Church and Autonomy; Orthodox Identity in India, Ed, M.K.Kuriakose, Fr.V.C.  Samuel 75th Birth Day Celebration Committee, Bangalore -1988
	Christological Controversy; Orthodox Identity in India
	History of the Malanakara Orthodox Christians, 18th Century; Indian Church History, Vol.

Books in Malayalam

	Yesu Christu Aaru (Who is Jesus Christ?);  Christian Literature Society (CLS),  Thiruvalla, India. 1967.
	Ithe Oru Indian Sabhayo? Is this an Indian Church?;  Distribution,  C.L.S, Thiruvalla, India, 1974.
	Sabha Valarunnu, (The Growing Church);: Indian Church History, Vol. I, Divyabodahan Series, O.T.S, Kottayam, India, 1984.
	Adhunika Bharatha Sabha (Modern Indian Church): Indian Church History, Vol.II; Divyabodahanam Series,
	O.T.S, Kottayam, India, 1984.
	Apposthala Pravarthikal Oru Vyakayanam, (Acts Of Apostles and Commentary); Translation from Greek and
	The Commentary;  Thiruvachanabhashyam, O.T. S, Kottayam, India.
	Mar Divannasios Nalaman, Cheppad Mar Divannasios: Mar Dionysius Charitable Trust, Kerala, India.
	Swanubhavavediyil: Malayalam, Autobiography, MGOCSM, Kottayam, India.
	Malankara Anthiokian Bandhathile Chila Charitra Satyangal  (Certain Truth about the Connection between
	The Churches of Malanaka and Antioch): Malankarasabhadeepam, Kottayam, India.
	Kristhuvijnaniyam; (A series of articles designed for publication as a book), Purohithan, Kottayam

Co-author
	Sabhayude Adisthana Viswasangal (Basic Faith of the Church);  Irupatam Nuttandile Malankara Sabha (The Church of Malabar in the Twentieth Century) Ed. T.G.Zacharia and K.V.Mammen, Kottayam, 1977.
	Malankara Sabhayude Antiokian Bandham (The Connection of Church of Malabar with Antioch); Irupatham Nuttandile Malankara Sabha, Ed.T.G.Zacharia and K.V.Mammen, Kottayam, 1977. It was published in Malankara Sabha, Kottayam.
	Yesu Christu – Aposttolica Prakyapanam (Jesus Christ - Apostolic Proclamation: Vedaputhakabhashyam (One Volume Commentary) Theological Literature Society, Thiruvalla, India, 1979.
	Daivasastra Darsanam (The Theological Vision of M.M.Thomas);  Viswasavum
	Prathyayasasthrvum (Faith and Ideology), Ed. Varghese George, CLS Thiruvalla.

Translation
	Pentakosthi Muthal Janana Perunalvare - Aradhana Getangal Malayalam, Translation from Syriac.
	Visudha Qurbana Thaksa;  Malayalam, Translation from Syriac Text.
	Holy Qurbana; English, Translation from Syriac Text.
	Peedanubhava Aazhchayile prarthanakal, (Worship of Holy Week): Malayalam, from Syriac, Addis Ababa.
	Wedding Ceremony: According to the Order of Malankara Orthodox Church.
	Baptism Ceremony:  According to the Order of Malankara Orthodox Church.
	Apposthala Pravarthikal (Acts Of Apostles) Translation from Greek Text.

Papers in English
	Towards a Doctrine of the Church; Church Weekly, Alwaye, India, 1955
	Cosmos on the Church of Malabar; Church Weekly, 1955
	Christ and Creation: Religion and Society, Christian Institute for the Study of Religion and Society (CISRS) Bangalore, India, 1957.
	Religious Affirmation of Ramakrishna Movement: Religion and Society, CISRS,  Bangalore, 1959.
	Vivekananda's Appraisal of Person of Jesus Christ;  Chicago University, 1959
	Ramakrishna Mission and its Work; Chicago, 1960.
	A Brief Historical Survey of the Council of Chalcedon, Indian Journal of Theology  (I.J.T), Calcutta, 1962
	And Church Weekly (C.W), Kottayam, India..
	Where they Monophysites?;  I.J.T, Calcutta and Church Weekly Kottayam, 1962
	Doctrine of Creation; Religion and Society, CISRS, Bangalore 1962.
	One Incarnate Nature of God the Word: Greek Orthodox Theological Review, winter, 164–165, Athens, 1964
	And Does Chalcedon Divide or Unite?; Ed. Paulos Mar Gregorios, William Lazareth and Nikos A Nissiotis, World Council of Churches (WCC), 1981.
	Humanity of Christ in Christian Tradition, Orthodox Theological Review, Athens, 1967
	Euteyches and His Condemnation, Bangalore Theological Forum, United Theological College, Bangalore 1967
	Proceedings of the Council of Chalcedon, The Ecumenical Review, October 1970,  Geneva and Abba Salama, 1970, Addis Ababa, Ethiopia.
	A Brief History of Efforts to Reunite the Chalcedonian and Non-Chalcedonian Sides,  Greek Orthodox Theological Review, 1971
	Witness of Orthodoxy;  St. Thomas 19th Centenary Souvenir, Orthodox Theological Seminary, Kottayam, 1972.(What is Orthodoxy)
	Marriage and Celibacy;  Abba Salama, Addis Ababa, 1972, and Church Weekly, 28 April 1974 to 23 June 1974
	The Christology of Severus of Antioch:  Abba Salama, Addis Ababa, 1973.
	The Understanding of the Christological Definition of both the Oriental Orthodox and Roman Catholic Traditions in the Light of the Post-Chalcedonian Theology: An Analysis of Terminologies in a Conceptual Framework, Wort und Wahrheit, Pro Oriente Vienna, 1973
	How can the Unity of Church be Achieved?;  Uniting in Hope, Commission of Faith and Order, World Council of Churches (W.C.C), Geneva, 1976
	Christianity and Indigenization;  Abba Salama, 1976 Addis Ababa
	Further Studies in the Christology of Severus of Antioch; Papers referring to the Theological Dialogue between Eastern and Oriental Orthodox Churches, Ed.  Archbishop Methodios of Aksum, Athens, 1976
	An Oriental Orthodox Assessment of the First Vatican Council's Infallibility Doctrine: Wort und Wahrheit, Theological Dialogue between Roman Catholic and Oriental Orthodox Churches, Pro-Oriente, Vienna, 1978.
	Vienna consultations, Star of the East, July 1979, Kottayam, India
	The Christological basis of some Syrian Orthodox Traditions, Star of the East, July 1980.
	The Nicene Creed, its Authorship and the Faith it Conserves: Star of the East, Oct-Dec. 1981, Kottayam.
	The Trinitarian Understanding of the Christian God in Relation to Monotheism and Polytheism;  WCC, Lima, 1982.
	Tradition Community and Hermeneutics; Indian Journal of Theology, Calcutta, July – December 1982.
	Eastern and Oriental Orthodox Churches: A Movement towards Church Unity; Star of the East, Kottayam, July – Sept. 1982.
	The Nicene Creed: Compared to the Apostles' Creed, the Quincunque Vult and the New Testament: The Roots of Our Faith, Ed. Hans-Georg Links, WCC Geneva, 1983.
	Our Church in History; Star of the East, Dec. 1983.
	The Mission Implications of Baptism, Eucharist and Ministry; International Review of Mission, Geneva, 1983.
	Mission in the Context of Religious Heritage: Councilor Unity, Ecumenical Christian Centre, Bangalore.
	Christian Missiological Challenges in a Society of other Religions: International Consultation of Theological Education, Gurukul, Madras.
       The International Syriac Conference, Mar Aprem and V.C.Samuel; Harp Vol.I, No1, St. Ephrem Ecumenical Research institute(SEERI), Kottayam, India.1987, 
	Christology and Terminology, Harp Vol.I, No. 2&3, St. Ephrem Ecumenical Research institute(SEERI), Kottayam, India. 
       A Way of Christian Unity, Harp Vol.I, No.1, SEERI, Kottayam, India 
	Christology; Joint International Commission for Dialogue between the Catholic Church and the Malankara

Books About V.C. Samuel 
ORTHODOX IDENTITY IN INDIA: Essays in Honour of V.C. Samuel; Ed. M.K. Kuriakose, Bangalore - 1988.

Fifty Golden Years: History of Orthodox Church in Bangalore; V.C. Samuel - 1994

Malankara Sabha Pithakkanamr (Church Fathers of Malankara Sabha) Dr. Samuel Chandanappally, CDS Books, 1991

Vaidikarude Vaidikan, Commemorative Volume, Ed, Dr. K.L. Mathew Vaidyan and E.J. Varghese, Rev. Dr. V.C. Samuel Ecumenical Study Forum, Konni, 2001

Maanavikathayum Ecumenisavum Samkalina Velluvili; Prof. Ninan Koshy,  Rev. Dr. V.C. Samuel Ecumenical Study Forum, Konni, 2004

Araadhanavijnaniyam, V.C. Samuel's posthumous work; Ed. E.J. Varghese,  Rev. Dr. V.C. Samuel Ecumenical Study Forum, Konni, 2004

The Twain Shall Meet: Ed. Fr. V.C. Jose, Orthodox Theological Study Series, Kottayam -2013

Sapthathiyude Niravil: History of Orthodox Church Bangalore; M.S. George, Bangalore, 2014

Reenvisioning Indian Orthodox Identity: A Historico Theological Understanding of V.C. Samuel,Dr. Ninan K. George, ISPCK, Delhi-2015.

References

External material

References

The St. Thomas Christians of India was called Nazranis; Marthomman Christians; Jacobite Syrian Christians Etc. Father V.C. Samuel named the Indian Orthodox Church in the second half of the twentieth century. See Samuel, V.C:  Ithe Oru Indian Sabhayo? (Is this an Indian Church?); Malayalam, C.L.S. Thiruvalla, India, 1974 and Kuriakose M.K, Fr. Ed. Orthodox Identity in India:  Dr. V.C. Samuel 75th Birth Day Celebration Committee, Bangalore.
Member of the Legislative Assembly - Sreemoolam Praja Sabha of Travancore.
Samuel V.C.; The Council of Chalcedon Re-Examined: A Historical Theological Survey; For the Senate of Serampore College; Christian Literature Society, Madras, 1977; British Orthodox Press, 2001.
Religion and Society: Christian Institute for the Study of Religion and Society, Bangalore, 1957.
Geevarughese Mar Osthathios: My Elder Brother and Guru; Ch. Vaidikarude Vaidikan: Commemorative Volume;  p. 492, Konni, Kerala, India, 2001.
Kuriakose M.K.; Ed, Orthodox Identity in India.
Samuel V.C: Ed. The Oriental Orthodox Churches Addis Ababa Conference January 1965: Addis Ababa – August 1965.
Abba Salama: Addis Ababa, 1972
Thomas M.M.: Opening Indian Orthodoxy for Dialogue about its Future; Orthodox Identity in India
Mathew Vaidyan K.L, Fr.Dr; Vaidikarude Vaidikan, Commemorative Volume, Rev. Dr. V.C. Samuel Ecumenical Forum, Konni, India, 2001.
Who was a Church leader, literary orator and winner of Catholicate Award
Samuel Chandanappally Dr: Malankara Sabha Pithakkanmar,  Grace Samuel, Ceedees Books, Chandanappally, 1991.
Kuriakose M.K: Orthodox Identity in India: Essays in Honour of V.C. Samuel; Vaidikarude.

Sources

The Council of Chalcedon Re-Examined: Father V.C.Samuel;  For the Senate of Serampore College;
Christian Literature Society, Madras, 1977; British Orthodox Press, 2001
A Brief Life History of Father V.C.Samuel: Sunny Kulathakka;  Ed. Kuriakose, M.K; Orthodox Identity in India: Essays in Honour of V.C. Samuel; Rev. Dr. V.C. Samuel 75th Birth Day Celebration Committee, Bangalore – 1988
Ente Chintha Vikasanam (Evolution of My Thinking); Autobiographical piece, Church Weekly, Alwaye, India. 1954.
Malayala Manorama Daily; Nov.19, 1998.
Ecumenical Contribution of V.C.Samuel; Sebastian, J. Jayakiran; Thomas, T.K; Ecumenical Review, 1 January 1999, WCC, Geneva.
The Oriental Orthodox Churches Addis Ababa Conference January 1965: Samuel, V.C:  Ed, Addis Ababa, August 1965.
Fifty Golden Years: Samuel, V.C:  Bangalore, 1994.
Vaidikarude Vaidikan: Rev.Dr.V.C.SamuelCommemorative Volume; Mathew Vaidyan, K.L, Fr.Dr.: Chief Editor, Varghese E.J, Editor, Ecumenical Forum, Konni, Kerala, India.

External links

 Official Website
Biography of V. C. Samuel
Ecumenical contribution
vc samuel album
Oriental Orthodox Churches 
A Brief Biography 
My Elder Brother and Guru; Gevarghese Mar Osthathios  

Indian Christian theologians
Malayali people
1912 births
1998 deaths
Theological College of the Holy Trinity alumni
Malankara Orthodox Syrian Church Christians
Yale Divinity School alumni
20th-century Oriental Orthodox Christians
People from Omallur